= Metropolis Radio =

Ownership
- Owner: Stela Bardo

History
- First air date: 2007

Links
- Webcast: Listen Live
- Website: www.metropolisradio.com.mk

Metropilis Radio (Macedonian Cyrillic: Метрополис радио) is private radio station from North Macedonia. The editor of the radio station is Slave Nikolovski.
